The 1998 Junior Pan American Artistic Gymnastics Championships was held in Houston, United States, July 14–19, 1998.

Medal summary

References

1998 in gymnastics
Pan American Gymnastics Championships
International gymnastics competitions hosted by the United States
1998 in American sports